Jenny Lynn (born 1953, Tampa, Florida), is an American photographer. She works and lives in Philadelphia, Pennsylvania.

Her 2004 monograph, "PhotoPlay," features photographs, collages, and photograms from thirty years of work. The book's introduction is by novelist and editor Richard Burgin. Photography curator Virginia Heckert wrote the book's essay.

Lynn's work has appeared in Photo District News, Zoom International magazine, The New Yorker, and other publications. She formerly taught at Philadelphia's University of the Arts.

One of her best-known pieces is the advertisement which first appeared in 1994, "Absolut Lynn."  The ad was part of the "Absolut Artists" series of advertisements for Absolut Vodka.

Lynn's one-person show, "The Object Is Art," was exhibited in 2008 at New York's Katonah Museum of Art.

Her public art projects include "Dreams In Transit," a 10 foot-by-30 foot permanent photographic installation at New Jersey Transit's 9th Street Station, in Hoboken, NJ.

Lynn conceived and edited a fall of 2015 book, "EyeBook: Sixty Artists. One Subject."  The book, an anthology, focuses upon the eye in art, and is published by Damiani Editore, of Bologna, Italy.

Collections
Philadelphia Museum of Art
Center for Creative Photography, Arizona

References

1953 births
Photographers from Philadelphia
People from Tampa, Florida
Living people
American women photographers
21st-century American women